Hakea candolleana is a shrub in the family Proteaceae native to areas along the west coast in the Wheatbelt and Mid West regions of Western Australia. A cream-white winter flowering species, useful as a garden ground cover.

Description
 
Hakea candolleana is a dense low growing lignotuberous multi-stemmed shrub. Typically growing to a height of  generally wider than tall. Smaller branches are densely covered in short matted hairs or flattened fine silky hairs either white or rusty coloured. Occasionally branches quickly become smooth and a bluish-green with a powdery film. Faintly scented flowers appear in leaf axils from June to August. Leaves are alternate, flat and linear, sometimes needle-shaped ending in a hard blunt point. Young leaves covered in soft matted hairs becoming smooth with age.

Taxonomy and naming
Hakea candolleana was first formally described by Carl Meissner in 1848. Hakea candolleana was named in honour of the Swiss botanist, Augustin Pyramus de Candolle.

Distribution and habitat
Hakea candolleana grows in heath or shrubland on sand, loam and clay and requires an open sunny aspect. Often found in low lying seasonally wet areas. It grows from the northern sand plains at the Murchison River to Perth and an outlying community at Tammin.

Conservation status
Hakea candolleana is presently listed as "not threatened" by Western Australian Government, Department of Parks and Wildlife.

References

candolleana
Eudicots of Western Australia
Plants described in 1848
Taxa named by Carl Meissner